"Crying Undercover" is the first solo single by Rania Zeriri. The maxi single contains three versions and the video of the title song as well as the song "Cursed and Blessed" written by Zeriri in 2006.
The single reached position 86 in the Germany Singles Top 100.

Track listing
Crying Undercover (radio) 3:06
Crying Undercover (acoustic) 3:06
Crying Undercover (instrumental) 3:06
Cursed And Blessed 4:12
Crying Undercover (video) 3:06

Personnel
 Producer: Achim Jannsen
 Crying Undercover
 Achim Jannsen and Class P. Jambor (lyrics and music)
 Sebastian Cuthbert - drums and double bass
 Jörg Sander - guitar
 Achim Jannsen - piano and organ
 Stefan Pintev - violin
 Gunnar Kockjoy - trumpet
 Paulo Pereira - saxophone
 Class P. Jambor - backing vocals
 Cursed And Blessed
 Rania Zeriri (lyrics)
 Rania Zeriri, Achim Jannsen and Class P. Jambor (music)
 Class P. Jambor - acoustic guitar
 Achim Jannsen - piano and string instruments
 Class P. Jambor and Rania Zeriri - backing vocals
 Publisher of both songs: EMI/Publishing/TAO House

References

External links 
 Official video

2008 singles
2008 songs
Kontor Records singles